FNZ is a financial services company that provides investment platforms to major financial institutions. FNZ serves financial institutions in 15 international markets across Europe, Asia Pacific, South Africa and North America.

History 

FNZ was founded as a start-up business in 2003 in New Zealand. Originally created as a business unit within the New Zealand branch of investment bank Credit Suisse, FNZ secured the majority of large institutional providers of investment platforms in NZ.

In 2012, global growth equity firm General Atlantic acquired a minority share in FNZ.

In June 2013, Lord Leitch was appointed Group Chairman of FNZ.

In February 2020, Temasek acquired a stake in FNZ.

Acquisitions 

In 2018, FNZ acquired German platform ebase from Commerzbank.

In 2019, FNZ acquired leading wealth management software firm JHC. The final decision from the CMA was for FNZ to sell GBST with rights to repurchase GBST's capital markets operations.

In 2020, FNZ acquired Irish third-party administration provider Irish Progressive Services International (IPSI) from Irish Life and agreed to acquire South African third-party administration firm Silica from Ninety One plc.

In 2021, FNZ acquired the Direct-to-consumer Hatch investment platform from Kiwi Wealth.

Customers 

FNZ partners with life insurance companies, banks, asset managers and discretionary wealth managers to deliver wealth management services in the three main distribution channels: independent financial advisers (IFAs), direct customers and the workplace.

They provide an end-to-end service, including investment front office, tax wrappers and investment back office under a platform as a service delivery model. This is combined with back office dealing, settlement and administration services as either sub-custodian or third party administrator.

FNZ's existing customers include:

 Vanguard
 Standard Life
 Aviva
 Lloyds Bank
 Zurich Insurance Group
 AXA Wealth
 HSBC
 Barclays
 Santander
 United Overseas Bank
 UBS
 National Australia Bank
 Bank of New Zealand
 ANZ Bank New Zealand
 AMP Limited
 Swedbank

References

Financial services companies of New Zealand
Software companies of New Zealand